Eogryllus is an extinct genus of crickets in family Gryllidae.

Taxonomy
The genus contains the following species:
Eogryllus elongatus† Gorochov, 2012
Eogryllus unicolor† Gorochov, 2012

References

Gryllinae
Orthoptera genera